Sanrakshan is an action movie which features Nikhil Upreti and Saugat Malla in main role of the movie. This movie tells the story of the politics of Nepal how they use their power to control whole nation.

Cast
 Nikhil Upreti
 Saugat Malla
 Malina Joshi
 Ashishma Nakarmi
 Ramesh Ranjan Jha
 Pramod Agrahari
 Amitesh Shah
 Nandu Shreewastav
 Sushant Shrestha
 Nirdesh Sriwastav

Songs

References

External links 
 Sanrakshan at Facebook

2010s Nepali-language films
2017 films
Nepalese action films